José Gaudencio Víctor León Castañeda (born 22 January 1960) is a Mexican politician from the National Action Party. From 2000 to 2003, he was a deputy in the LVIII Legislature of the Mexican Congress representing Puebla.

References

1960 births
Living people
Politicians from Puebla
National Action Party (Mexico) politicians
21st-century Mexican politicians
Deputies of the LVIII Legislature of Mexico
Members of the Chamber of Deputies (Mexico) for Puebla